Ellen Meijers is a Dutch video game music composer who worked for such companies as Apple Inc., LucasArts, Oddworld Inhabitants and Crystal Dynamics.

Education
The Royal College of Art, England 1994–1995 Master of Arts: Interactive Multi Media
Utrecht School of the Arts, The Netherlands 1991–1995 Music Technology: Computer Composition & Sound Design
University of Utrecht, The Netherlands 1989–1994 Master's Degree in Musicology: 20th Century Composition

Awards
Her first notable achievement was the earning of the Highest Honors in International Piano Competition (Antwerp, Belgium — 1988).

In 1995 she won the Adobe-award for the most professional project shown at the Royal College of Art exhibition.

She also won the Editors' Choice Award for Best Sound (Oddworld: Abe's Oddysee — 1997) and was a finalist for the first Interactive Achievement Award for Outstanding Achievement in Sound and Music (Oddworld: Abe's Exoddus — 1998).

Video game soundtracks

Apple Inc.
 Maze
 Texas Hold'em
 Test Prep
 Klondike
 iQuiz

LucasArts
 Lego Star Wars II: The Original Trilogy
 Star Wars: Empire at War
 Star Wars: Battlefront II
 Star Wars: Episode III Revenge of the Sith
 Mercenaries: Playground of Destruction
 Secret Weapons Over Normandy
 Armed and Dangerous
 RTX Red Rock

Oddworld Inhabitants
 Oddworld: Abe's Oddysee
 Oddworld: Abe's Exoddus

The Greater Bay Area Make-A-Wish Foundation
 Ben's Game

References

External links
Ellen Meijers Studios '' 

Dutch musicians
Video game composers
Year of birth missing (living people)
Living people
Utrecht School of the Arts alumni
Place of birth missing (living people)
Utrecht University alumni
Alumni of the Royal College of Art